Athrips kerzhneri is a moth of the family Gelechiidae. It is found in Mongolia, Russia (Tuva) and China (Inner Mongolia).

The wingspan is 8–11 mm. The forewings are yellow, with the costa, termen and apical half of the posterior margin black. There is a small black spot at two-thirds near the posterior margin. The hindwings are grey.

References

Moths described in 1990
Athrips
Moths of Asia